Ted Hugh Rowlands (born September 27, 1966) is an American newscaster who previously worked at CNN and KTVU Channel 2 in the Bay Area. He is currently employed by Court TV.

Career

Rowlands is a general assignment correspondent for CNN based in Chicago. Rowlands is best known for his coverage of high-profile criminal cases, including Scott Peterson, Michael Jackson, O. J. Simpson and Phil Spector. 

Rowlands was CNN’s lead reporter in the death of Michael Jackson and for the trial of Dr. Conrad Murray for the involuntary manslaughter of Michael Jackson.

Personal life
Rowland is married to Erica Sanson.

External links
Profile
Rowlands's biography at cnn.com

1966 births
Living people
CNN people
American television reporters and correspondents
Place of birth missing (living people)